The General Union of Palestine Students (GUPS) is an organization run by Palestinian students since the early 1920s. It is generally considered one of the first Palestinian institutions started. It was officially launched in Cairo in 1959 with chapters formed in universities all over the arab world.

Several Palestinian politicians, writers, journalists and militants have been members or leaders of the GUPS. They include Yasser Arafat, Hanan Ashrawi, Faisal Husseini, Walid Khalidi and many others.

The organization is a member of the World Federation of Democratic Youth.

Following the Oslo Accords, the majority of GUPS chapters collapsed. Prior to the signing of the Accords, there were 60 GUPS chapters on US campuses. Today, only the San Francisco State University chapter remains operational in the US. Several GUPS chapters remain operational outside of the US, including in Chile and the United Kingdom.

Notable individuals 
Notable members include Yasser Arafat, Hanan Ashrawi, Faisal Husseini, Walid Khalidi and many more.

Nearing the end of the 1948 Arab–Israeli War Yasser Arafat moved to Cairo in order to re-enrol in the University of King Fuad I, later known as Cairo University, studying civil engineering and serving as chairman of the GUPS from 1952 until the year of his graduation of 1956 as well as the chairman of the Federation of Palestinian Students, both considered important positions in Palestinian politics. Abu Iyad, served as Secretary General of GUPS whilst studying at Al Azhar University before being deported by Egyptian secret police to Gaza in 1983 during the last year of his studies. The pair along with Khaled Yashruti, the then head of GUPS in Beirut, and others later formed Fatah in 1959.

Bombing at Patra, Greece 
In 1991, a Palestinian member of the Union of Palestinian Students in Patra (Greece), was responsible for a bombing which killed seven people (six Greeks and the bomber), injured eight and destroying large parts of a six-story office building at Patra. According to the police the bomb he was carrying exploded prematurely. The bomber was a 26 years old student of the Polytechnic School of the University of Patras with Jordanian passport. 
Greek authorities believed that the target was the British consulate at the city which was nearby. Later, six more Palestinian students arrested in Greece in connection with the attack. After searching, the authorities found AK-47 assault riffles, remote controlled detonators and explosives at their apartments.

References

External links 
General Union of Palestine students - official website | GUPS.org  
Collection of GUPS posters

Student organizations established in 1959
Palestine Liberation Organization
Palestinian organizations
Palestinian terrorist incidents in Europe
Greece–State of Palestine relations
Palestinian terrorist incidents in Greece